Edward Mwanza (born 10 March 1989) is a Zambian long-distance runner. He competed at the World Cross Country Championships in 2013, 2015 and 2019.

In 2019, he competed in the senior men's race at the 2019 IAAF World Cross Country Championships held in Aarhus, Denmark. He finished in 112th place.

References

External links 
 

Living people
1989 births
Place of birth missing (living people)
Zambian male long-distance runners
Zambian male cross country runners